Aquatic biodiversity research is the field of scientific research studying marine and freshwater biological diversity.

Development

After the Earth Summit in Rio, 1992 and the adoption of the Convention on Biological Diversity, the term biodiversity has become a component of research policy in many countries and international bodies and initiatives. Biodiversity however, is not a concept but an umbrella term (Haila and Kouki 1994); the content of which is quite diverse as can be inferred by definitions provided in many different texts (Wilson 1988, Reid and Miller 1989, CBD 1992, Margalef 1997). The distinction between diversity and biodiversity is also fairly unclear in many studies in biology.
As with most other issues in Ecology and Evolution, paradigms dominating the study of biodiversity on both global and regional scales come mainly from the terrestrial environment despite the marked distinctive features of marine biodiversity and the fact that the aquatic (freshwater & marine) environment occupies more than two thirds of the Earth’s surface (Vanaverbeke et al. 1997, Gessner et al. 2004). Marine organisms play crucial roles in many bio-geochemical processes that sustain the biosphere, and provide a variety of products and functions which are essential to mankind’s well-being, including the production of food and natural substances, the assimilation of waste and regulation of the world’s climate. The rate and efficiency of any processes that marine organisms mediate, as well as the range of goods and services that they provide, are determined by interactions between organisms and interactions between organisms and their environment; and therefore by biodiversity (Gaston 1996, Gaston and Spicer 1998). These relationships have not yet been quantified, and we are at present unable to predict the consequences of loss of biodiversity resulting from environmental change in ecological, economic or social terms (Walker, 1992, Lawton and Brown, 1994, Ehrlich and Ehrlich, 1981, Lawton, 1994, Vitousek and Hooper 1994). The influence of species diversity on the productivity of marine ecosystems on a large scale is still unclear (Cardinale et al. 2004).

Terrestrial vs. marine biodiversity 
Terrestrial paradigms do not necessarily apply to marine biota. Our understanding of the role and regulation of aquatic biodiversity lies far behind that of terrestrial biodiversity, to such an extent that we do not have enough scientific information to underpin management issues such as conservation and sustainable use of marine resources. Many of these paradigms may not be applicable to the marine situation because of differences to terrestrial ecosystems (Heip et al. 1998, Gessner et al. 2004). A greater variety of species at a higher trophic level are exploited in the sea than on land. Exploitation of marine biodiversity is also far less managed than on land (Heip et al. 1998, Giller et al. 2004). Environmental change in the sea has a much lower frequency than on land, both temporally and spatially. Marine systems are more open than terrestrial and dispersal of species may occur over much broader ranges than on land (Heip et al. 1998). The main marine primary producers are very small and often mobile, whereas on land primary producers are large and static. The standing stock of grazers is higher than that of primary producers in the sea, the reverse of the situation on land. In the largest part of the ocean, beneath the shallow surface layers, no photosynthesis occurs at all (Heip et al. 1998, Giller et al. 2004). In addition, pollution from the air, land and freshwater ultimately enters the sea and therefore marine biodiversity is most exposed to, and critically influences the fate of, pollutants in the world (Heip et al. 1998).
Published research affects decision making on conservation of biodiversity. Conservation measures taken for biodiversity of an area depend also on the areas ecological, economic and social importance, as evaluated by science and society (Wackernagel et al. 1999, Constanza 1997, CDB 1992). On the other hand, while conservation measures are usually taken for some species, there are several cases where species of virtually no commercial value become extinct almost unnoticed (Casey and Myers 1998).

Marine biology